Jean-Marie Berthier (25 June 1940 – 8 August 2017) was a French poet. He taught literature in Africa, Asia and South America, and was the author of over 20 poetry collections.

Berthier won the 2010 Prix François Coppée from the Académie française for Attente très belle de mon attente.

See also
French poetry

References

1940 births
2017 deaths
Writers from Marseille
French male poets
20th-century French poets
21st-century French poets
Road incident deaths in France
20th-century French male writers
21st-century French male writers